Gaeanini is a tribe of cicadas in the family Cicadidae, found in the Palearctic and Indomalaya. There are about 10 genera and at least 50 described species in Gaeanini.

Genera
These 10 genera belong to the tribe Gaeanini:
 Ambragaeana Chou & Yao, 1985 c g
 Balinta Distant, 1905 c g
 Becquartina Kato, 1940 c g
 Callogaeana Chou & Yao, 1985 c g
 Gaeana Amyot & Audinet-Serville, 1843 c g
 Paratalainga He, 1984 c g
 Sulphogaeana Chou & Yao, 1985 c g
 Talainga Distant, 1890 c g
 Taona Distant, 1909 c g
 Trengganua Moulton, 1923 c g
Data sources: i = ITIS, c = Catalogue of Life, g = GBIF, b = Bugguide.net

Notes

References

 Metcalf, Z.P. (1963) General Catalogue of the Homoptera, fascicle VIII, Cicadoidea, part 1. Cicadidae. section II. Gaeninae and Cicadinae. North Carolina State College, Raleigh, pp. 587–919.

 
Cicadinae
Hemiptera tribes